Sebastian Heidel (born 26 May 1989) is a German footballer who plays for Landesliga club Victoria Wittenberg.

Career 
Heidel began his career with FC Grün-Weiß Piesteritz, moving in 2005 to the youth team at Hallescher FC until July 2007. In summer 2007, he signed a contract with FC Carl Zeiss Jena, where he played one season in the youth team and one in the reserve squad. On 21 February 2009 he played his first game for FC Carl Zeiss Jena's first team against Kickers Emden in the German 3. Liga.

In 2022, Heidel joined Victoria Wittenberg competing in the Landesliga.

References 

1989 births
Living people
People from Zwickau
People from Bezirk Karl-Marx-Stadt
German footballers
Footballers from Saxony
Association football forwards
FC Carl Zeiss Jena players
VfL Halle 1896 players
VfB Lübeck players
3. Liga players
Hallescher FC players
Regionalliga players
Oberliga (football) players
Landesliga players